The Irish Women's Volleyball Championship is an annual competition for Irish women's volleyball teams. It has been held since the year 1972.
Competitions are held in three divisions - Premier League, Division 1 and Division 2. The championships are organized by the  Volleyball Association of Ireland.

Competition formula (Premier League)
In the championship all teams hold a two-round tournament, the results of which determine the final ranking. For 3:0 and 3:1 wins teams get 3 points, 3:2 win - 2 points, for 2:3 defeats - 1 point, for 1:3 and 0:3 defeats no points are awarded. 
There were eight teams in the 2021/22 Premier League championship: "The Guardians (Talla), UCD (Dublin), Suntree Calypso (Dublin), Dublin Lions, Nees Cobras (Nees), TCD (Dublin), Suntree -2 (Dublin), Galway. The Guardians won the championship title. 2nd place went to UCD and 3rd place went to Suntree Calypso. The 2020/21 championship was cancelled.

List of winners

References

External links
 Ireland Volleyball Federation

Irish League
1972 establishments in Ireland
Volleyball in Ireland 
Irish League